Qalat Jenah Castle is a historical castle located in Bastak County in Hormozgan Province, Iran.

References 

Castles in Iran